Jan Škrdlík (born 31 October 1964 in Ostrava) is a  Czech cellist, of the younger school of the Czech cello players, an artist, a writer and a teacher.

Biography
The family came from Slovácko, a rural region in the south of the country. Parents Jaroslav and Anna Škrdlík moved to the town of Ostrava in search of work. The name “Škrdlík” is derived from the word škrle, a tool for the working of millstones used in Moravia in the 12th century,  inspired by the sound of metal scratching stone. (Škrdlík's grandfather maintained mill machinery.)

Jan Škrdlík was led to music by his mother, a violin teacher and he decided to become a professional musician at the age of 17. His teachers Jan Hališka (a professor at the Ostrava Conservatory) and Miroslav Doležil (a primary school teacher) had studied under Bohuš Heran, a private pupil of Hanuš Wihan, founder of the Czech Quartet. The young violoncellist was thus influenced by one of the leading lights of Czech music in modern times.
In 1987-1991 he studied at the Janáček Academy of Music and Performing Arts, Brno under Professor Bedřich Havlík, a member of the Moravian Quartet. Brno is capital of Moravia, the southern portion of the Czech lands, and Škrdlík felt strongly influenced by Leoš Janáček his fierce native pride in the area and the inspiration he derived from it, as well as by the whole atmosphere of the city. Further development was shaped by Josef Chuchro and Daniel Veis. An opportunity to study under Spanish virtuoso Luis Claret in Barcelona proved a milestone on the path to gathering experience and knowledge. Jan Škrdlík's musical career is characterised by his openness to new trends and a constant quest for valid options in musical interpretation.

Jan Škrdlík started to take part in competitions in the late 1980s, both as a solo musician and as part of ensembles, and won his first awards. His greatest success was the Silver Medal and the Special Prize for the best rendering of a Beethoven composition at the prestigious International Beethoven Contest in Hradec. Consistently high standards led to being awarded a year's scholarship visit to Spain in the late 1980s. During his studies in Barcelona, he helped establish the first professional ensemble in Murcia, southern Spain. In 1991, the Czechoslovak Music Foundation awarded him their prize for the promotion of Czech music abroad. Since then, Jan Škrdlík has performed in Europe and beyond, both solo and as part of music ensembles.

Concerts and recordings 
The number of concerts that Jan Škrdlík has given over the past twenty years runs easily into four figures. His first public performance took place in spring 1990, shortly after returning from Murcia, in Spain (1988–89), where he had been studying and where he had also helped start a professional ensemble, the first of its kind there. He then toured Czechoslovakia with piano player Pedro Valer Abril, with whom he also recorded Prokofiev's Piano Sonata No. 9 in C major, Op. 103, in the Olomouc studio of Czech Broadcasting [Český rozhlas]. Some months later he joined the Wallinger Quartet, a highly respected chamber music ensemble, a position that brought with it many opportunities to perform in the Czech Republic and beyond in the early 1990s. The Wallinger Quartet played concerts all over central, western and south-western Europe and performed regularly in the USA.
The Wallinger Quartet concerts apart, Jan Škrdlík also performed in violoncello recitals and later became a soloist with various orchestras. The recitals included concerts with the piano played by Renata Ardaševová, among other leading pianists, and concerts with the cembalo played by Barbara Maria Willi. Jan Škrdlík also collaborated with other chamber music ensembles and helped establish, among others, Ardor musicus, the Czech Baroque Trio, the Gideon Trio and Ensemble Messiaen. In 2004 he help establish the ensemble known as the Brno Chamber Soloists ensemble, which specialises in 19th- and 20th-century music. A year later he toured the US with them as soloist; in the course of six weeks he performed on 35 stages and critics in Miami lauded his performance as “a sensation”.

Škrdlík has recorded for several labels. His CD performance of Bach's Suites  was noted outside the Czech Republic. He recorded in the studios of Czech Broadcasting regularly in the 1990s.

A list of Jan Škrdlík concerts covering the period January 1994 - June 2009 may be found in Povoláním – člověk, biografie violoncellisty Jana Škrdlíka [“Vocation: – Ordinary Man: A Biography of Jan Škrdlík”], written by Radoslav Kvěch.

Films and multimedia concerts 
In 2007, the theft of Jan Škrdlík's violoncello inspired what was possibly the first instrumental classical music video in history. The instrument, a precious product of the craft of Adam Emanuel Homolka in 1842, was stolen from his studio; news of the crime merited a spot on TV news and the violoncello was returned. A year later, this led to the innovative Claude Debussy – Sonate pour violoncelle et piano, set as a short film narrative, with mime, an imaginative performance based on events around the “crime”. A Czech-Slovak team, including Czech film director Milan Růžička, created the film, which Škrdlík later used as part of multimedia concerts; it was employed as back-projection for live performances. Several films made for similar purposes followed.

Social involvement and scholarship 
Jan Škrdlík's social involvement and scholarly activities have had indirect influences on the direction and nature of his music. They fall into three categories.
Charity and welfare
 He is an engaged and active participant in charity and welfare activities. These include, for example, religiously based performances in the Břeclav prison, in collaboration with Father Jan Majer, and heading a club for Roma children under the aegis of the Brno Evangelist church in 2000-2009 that included a religious programme and music in its agenda. He has helped set up and organise musical events such as the Effatha festival and the Music not just for the Angels concert cycle, still in progress.
Academic development and language
 An interest in languages led him to enrol at Masaryk University, Brno to study linguistics and the Romance languages, with special reference to Spanish language and literature in 2008. Seeking to exercise his talent and expand general language knowledge, he accepted a part-time job as teacher of Spanish at the Moravské gymnázium, Brno in late 2007.
Academic development and the science of acoustics
 Jan Škrdlík conducts research into string tuning and the subjective influences of frequencies and harmonics. Working with other experts, such as musicologist Luděk Zenkl and cembalist Barbara Maria Willi, he addresses the tuning of historical instruments and its relationship to harmonic sets. His Využití intonačních pásem ve hře na smyčcové nástroje [“Usage of Tuning Bands in String Instruments”] sums up the results, which he applies further in several ways:
 In pedagogical matters, his attention is upon the relationship between his results and psychology.
 In concert, he employs a phenomenon known as “differential oscillations”, which he calls “natural vibrato”. This can colour every note interpreted to a greater or lesser extent, and may be taken further to shape any given music phrase.
 The results of his research are primarily employed in the construction of violoncellos and other stringed instruments. They find particular application in the use of the fifth eurhythmic string led below fingerboard, tuned in such fashion that its vibrations favourably influence the production of a tone.

Teaching
In 1997-2009 Jan Škrdlík taught violoncello and chamber music performance at the Brno Conservatory. Some of his students went on to work with him on the organisation of a variety of musical projects, or became players in ensembles that he led. Further pedagogical activities include teaching violoncello interpretation courses in Murcia, Spain in 2003 and international courses in baroque music in Kelč in 2009 and elsewhere. His teaching aims to support the natural musical development of the student with respect to the development of her/his personality; it is far less concerned with criticism of performance.

After twenty years on the Czech music scene Jan Škrdlík has come to realise that Czech society lacks a wider base of enthusiastic amateur musicians that might promote interest in classical music. Since 2004 he has helped organise interpretation courses in Opočno, and led them, providing a milieu in which amateur musician can play alongside conservatory students and university-trained musicians.

Writing
Jan Škrdlík has written a book of poetry, Tvá slova [“Thy Words”], and several sociologically oriented popular articles, published in Kamínky journal of the Family and Social Care Centre, Brno. He has also written other pieces in Czech and Spanish.

Discography
CD's with solo cello compositions:
 JANÁČEK-MARTINŮ-KODÁLY, Jan Škrdlík, Cello, Renata Ardaševová, Piano, Edice Českého rozhlasu, 1998
J.S.BACH – CELLO SUITES, Jan Škrdlík, Cello, Gnosis, 2002
MYSLIVEČEK-SUK-JANÁČEK-ŠTĚDROŇ, Brno Chamber Soloists (Brněnští komorní sólisté), Jan Škrdlík, Cello, Gnosis, 2004
HAYDEN WAYNE – DANCES FOR CELLO AND PIANO & STRING QUINTET, Jan Škrdlík, Cello, Petra Besa Pospíšilová, Piano, WALLINGER QUARTET, New Millennium, 2004
J.CH.BACH-MOZART-JANÁČEK-ŠTĚDROŇ, Brno Chamber Soloists (Brněnští komorní sólisté), Michiko Otaki, Piano, Jan Škrdlík, Cello, Art Petra Production, 2005
MILOŠ ŠTĚDROŇ – AUSTERLITZ, Jan Škrdlík, Cello, Studio π vox, 2007
 J.S. BACH – CELLO SUITES & SAMPLER, Double CD, Tenth label anniversary recording, Jan Škrdlík, Cello, Brno Chamber Soloists [Brněnští komorní sólisté], Renata Ardaševová, Piano, and others, Art Petra Production, 2006
BEETHOVEN-DEBUSSY-FRANCK. Jan Škrdlík, Cello, Petra Besa Pospíšilová, Piano, Art Petra Production, 2006
CD's with the Wallinger Quartet:
 LEOŠ JANÁČEK – STRING QUARTETS, WALLINGER QUARTET, Pavel Wallinger and Jan Vašta, Violin, Miroslav Kovář, Viola, Jan Škrdlík, Cello, Musica, 1993
 W.A. MOZART – STRING QUARTETS, WALLINGER QUARTET, Pavel Wallinger and Jan Vašta, Violin, Miroslav Kovář, Viola, Jan Škrdlík, Cello, Monitor Records, 1993
 DVOŘÁK-BRAHMS, Jiří Šlégl, Clarinet, WALLINGER QUARTET, Pavel Wallinger and Jan Vašta, Violin, Miroslav Kovář, Viola, Jan Škrdlík, Cello, Tonus, 2002
 HAYDEN WAYNE – STRING QUARTETS #1, #2, WALLINGER QUARTET, Pavel Wallinger and Jan Vašta, Violin, Miroslav Kovář, Viola, Jan Škrdlík, Cello, New Millennium, 1998
HAYDEN WAYNE – STRING QUARTETS #3, #4, #5, WALLINGER QUARTET, Pavel Wallinger and Jan Vašta, Violin, Miroslav Kovář, Viola, Jan Škrdlík, Cello, New Millennium, 1999
HAYDEN WAYNE – STRING QUARTETS #6, #7, #8, WALLINGER QUARTET, Pavel Wallinger and Jan Vašta, Violin, Miroslav Kovář, Viola, Jan Škrdlík, Cello, New Millennium, 2000
HAYDEN WAYNE – STRING QUARTETS #9, #10, WALLINGER QUARTET, Pavel Wallinger and Jan Vašta, Violin, Miroslav Kovář, Viola, Jan Škrdlík, Cello, New Millennium, 2001
CD's with the Gideon String Trio:
 KLEIN-HAYDN-MATYS-SCHUBERT, GIDEON STRING TRIO, Pavel Wallinger, Violin, Karel Plocek, Viola, Jan Škrdlík, Cello, Gnosis, 2004
 BEETHOVEN-MATYS, GIDEON STRING TRIO, Pavel Wallinger, Violin, Karel Plocek, Viola, Jan Škrdlík, Cello, Karel Plocek, 2007
CD's with the Czech Baroque Trio:
 KRAMÁŘ-JÍROVEC-KOŽELUH-VAŇHAL, CZECH BAROQUE TRIO, Antonín Rous, Violin, Jan Škrdlík, Cello, Martin Jakubíček, hammerklavier, Studio Matouš, 2001
 FRANTIŠEK BENDA – VIOLIN SONATAS, CZECH BAROQUE TRIO, Antonín Rous, Violin, Jan Škrdlík, Cello, Martin Jakubíček, Harpsichord, Positive, Studio Matouš, 1999
CD's with other ensembles:
 MILOSLAV IŠTVÁN – CHAMBER MUSIC, Wallinger Quartet, Dama Dama, Mondschein, Jiří Richter-Viola, Martin Opršál-Percussion, Emil Drápela-Clarinet, Dana Drápelová-Piano, Studio Matouš, 1999
 MILOŠ ŠTĚDROŇ – VILLANELLE PER WILLI, Barbara Willi-Harpsichord, Štěpán Graffe-Violin, Jan Vašta- Violin, Jan Škrdlík-Cello, Ctibor Bártek-Percussion, Studio π vox, 2006

References

External links
 Violoncellist Jan Škrdlík website

1964 births
Czech classical cellists
Janáček Academy of Music and Performing Arts alumni
Masaryk University alumni
Living people
Academic staff of Brno Conservatory